Milton Rodrigo Benítez Lirio (born 30 March 1986) is a Paraguayan footballer who currently plays for Sport Huancayo as midfielder.

Career
Benítez started his career in Paraguayan club Libertad in 2005, moving on to play for other clubs such as Olimpia and 3 de Febrero.

In December 2008, Brazilian side Vasco da Gama signed Benítez.

Honours

Player
Huachipato
 Primera División de Chile (1): 2012 Clausura

References

External links

1986 births
Living people
Paraguayan footballers
Paraguayan expatriate footballers
Paraguay international footballers
Club Libertad footballers
Club Olimpia footballers
Club Atlético 3 de Febrero players
Sportivo Luqueño players
Club Sol de América footballers
Club Sportivo San Lorenzo footballers
C.D. Huachipato footballers
CR Vasco da Gama players
Chilean Primera División players
Expatriate footballers in Chile
Expatriate footballers in Brazil
Association football midfielders
Deportivo Binacional FC players